Cnodalon viride is a species of darkling beetles in the family Tenebrionidae.

Distribution
This species is present in Haiti.

References

External links

Tenebrionidae
Fauna of Haiti
Beetles described in 1804